EHRC may refer to:

 Equality and Human Rights Commission, public body responsible for promotion and enforcement of equality laws in England and Wales
 Ethiopian Human Rights Commission, public body responsible for promoting human rights and investigating human rights abuses in Ethiopia